Split Lake, or Tataskwayak, is a community in Manitoba on the northern shore of Split Lake along the Nelson River, about  west southwest of the river's mouth at Hudson Bay, and is within the Tataskweyak Cree Nation reserve, Split Lake 171.

History
In 1908, Tataskweyak Cree Nation (Split Lake Band) representatives signed an adhesion to Treaty 5.

Tataskweyak Cree Nation is well known for being one of the most wealthiest First Nation in Northern Manitoba despite the fact that they do have a very-low Employment Rate as per 2020; the Community is also known to have a blooming economy according to charts on First Nations provided by the Manitoba Government. Tataskweyak provides a variety of jobs to its community members as per 2016; they had a population well over 3500+ And in 2021 there is an estimated 5000+ members (no accurate data available) though believed to have bloomed in population, the community has their best efforts coming out of multiple programs providing many benefits for its entire population. Although Tataskweyak Cree Nation leaders have spent millions of dollars to better help their community, many community members feel abandoned or ignored by local leadership

Split Lake has had a high number of youth suicides in the year of 2021.

Geography
Split Lake is on the Hudson Bay Railway line that ends at the Port of Churchill. Grey Goose Bus Lines and other companies such as Arctic Beverages and Old Dutch Foods provides the community with freight and goods on a daily basis.

The community of Split Lake is located on a peninsula on the northern shore of Split Lake. The Burntwood River and the Nelson River flows into the west end of Split Lake. The Grass River (Manitoba) joins the Nelson just before it enters the lake. The Nelson flows east out from the east end of the lake.

Culture
The community also has an annual ice fishing derby, where the first prize is usually a vehicle, as sometimes it has cash prizes, as well as a sporting event every year which is called "indian days".

Tataskweyak is Famously known for their New year celebrations where the community gathers as one and welcomes people from all over the Manitoba Province to celebrate the New Years with events and entertainment from multiple acts and all sorts of talents from Square dancing to Music competition it is a very special night long-awaited every year from its community members. In the month of August every year, Tataskweyak Annual Treaty and Indian Days are special one week events of competitive competition open to all its members, from toddlers to teens, adults to seniors, Indian days is truly a well celebrated week that has multiple cash prizes, many merchandise prizes, giveaways, sports events, water events, tournaments, traditional Leisure activities.

Also, not only in August do they celebrate they also provide the same community fun where they host the annual Winterfest usually in the months of March–April, where family winter fun is celebrated from Winter Games, Snowshoe activities, ice fishing activities, traditional outdoor teachings, every year crowning their King and Queen Trapper.

Demographics

In the 2021 Census of Population conducted by Statistics Canada, Split Lake had a population of 2,232 living in 410 of its 421 total private dwellings, a change of +9.2% from its 2016 population of 2,044.

References

External links
 Tataskweyak Cree Nation Official Website
Tataskweyak Cree Nation profile

Hudson's Bay Company trading posts
Localities in Manitoba
Unincorporated communities in Manitoba